Hibernia is the name of the following places in the U.S. state of Indiana:
Hibernia, Clark County, Indiana
Hibernia, Montgomery County, Indiana